Ballistic training, also incorrectly referred to as power training, is a form of training which involves throwing weights, and jumping with weights, in order to increase explosive power. 
The term ballistic refers to a method of training, where the athletes' body or an external object is explosively projected into a flight phase [31] and can, therefore, include exercises such as jumps, throws, or strikes. The intention in ballistic exercises is to maximise the acceleration phase of an object's movement and minimise the deceleration phase. For instance, throwing a medicine ball maximises the acceleration of the ball; this can be contrasted with a standard weight training exercise where there would be a pronounced deceleration phase at the end of the repetition i.e. at the end of a bench press exercise the barbell is decelerated and brought to a halt. Similarly, an athlete jumping whilst holding a trap bar maximises the acceleration of the weight through the process of holding it whilst they jump; where as they would decelerate it at the end of a standard trap bar deadlift.

History

The word ballistic comes from the Greek word βάλλειν (ballein), which means “to throw”. Evidence of ballistic training can be seen throughout recorded history, especially in depictions which show the throwing of a large stone (stone put). Other ballistic disciplines from antiquity include the javelin throw and the discus throw. The hammer throw is a younger discipline, known from the 15th century.

Such throws have been both a popular sporting pastime, and a training method employed by soldiers. Ballistic training was first used in the modern day by elite athletes when they were looking to enhance their ability to perform explosively. Commonly used modern ballistic training exercises are medicine ball throws, bench throws, jump squats, cleans, snatches, and push presses.

Focus and effects

Ballistic training forces the athlete's body to recruit and trigger fast twitch muscle fibers.  This is important because these muscle fibers have the greatest potential for growth and strength.  Ballistic training requires the muscles to adapt to contracting very quickly and forcefully.  This training requires the central nervous system to coordinate and produce the greatest amount of force in the shortest time possible.

In traditional weight training the athlete accelerates the weight on the concentric portion over the first third of the lift. During the other two-thirds of the lift, the weight is being slowed—decelerated—and then stopped. With ballistic training, the weight is accelerated through the whole range of motion and only starts to decelerate after the athlete has released the bar. The National Strength and Conditioning Association's Basic Guidelines for the Resistance Training of Athletes states that "performing speed repetitions as fast as possible with light weight (e.g., 30–45% of 1-RM) in exercises in which the bar is held on to and must be decelerated at the end of the joint’s range of motion (e.g., bench press) to protect the joint does not produce power or speed training but teaches the body how to decelerate, or slow down. If the load can be released into the air (i.e., the bar be let go at the end of the range of motion) the negative effects are eliminated."

Additional research has shown that as much as 75% of a movement can be devoted to slowing the bar down. Elliot, et al. (1989) reported that during 1-RM bench presses, the bar decelerates for the final 24% of the range of motion. At 81% of 1-RM, the bar decelerates for the final 52% of the range of motion. Research has shown that for best results it is important to load the bar with the amount of weight that allows for positive acceleration to be maintained through the full range of motion for the lift. An effective ballistic lift develops speed throughout the entire range of motion of the lift until the moment of release.

Criteria
1. Muscle recruitment principles. Ballistic lifts force the muscles to produce the greatest amount of force in the shortest amount of time. In accordance with Henneman's size principle muscle fibers are recruited from a low to a high threshold as force requirements increase.

2. Speed of the movement.  To ensure full muscle fiber recruitment the speed of the lift must be propulsive through the entire range of the movement up until release.

3. Intensity of the exercise. The duration of the lift should be measured by repetitions or time. The lift should be stopped when the bar decelerates. Research has shown the 6-8 repetitions or 20–30 seconds produces the best results.

4. Cardiovascular benefits. Ballistic exercises performed continuously for a minimum of 20 seconds followed by a 30-second rest period and then repeated until deceleration occurs has been proven to elevate the heart rate to training zone level. 

5. Co-ordination. Research at the University of Connecticut found that high-intensity training has profound effects on the nervous system. The exercise had to be of an intensity that elevate the heart rate to 90% of maximum rate and had to sustain that rate for at least 20 seconds.

6. Electronic measurement. There are several electronic measurement systems that measure the velocity, power, and effectiveness of a lift. The athlete should stop the lift when the speed of a lift has fallen to 90% of their previous lift. The 90% number signals that there has been a significant change in the recruitment of the fast-twitch muscle fibers. Below the 90% number the lift is no longer ballistic

7. Specificity of training. Ballistic training emphasizes throwing and jumping with a weighted object. Research has resulted in positive increases in vertical jump, throwing velocity, and running speed. There is limited transfer to a specific sport.

Use in metabolic conditioning
Ballistic exercises have traditionally been left out of metabolic conditioning workouts and training programs. This may be due to the fact that they are often technical lifts, or lifts/exercises for which technique is crucial to safe and effective completion. However, with the extensive availability of information and guidance in learning and developing proficiency in ballistic exercise, this trend is changing.

Many training programs which employ circuit training or metabolic conditioning now include ballistic exercises such as kettlebell cleans and snatches, Olympic lifts and variations, throws and plyometric variations. The benefits of their inclusion in these types of programs include higher levels of motor unit recruitment, higher caloric burn and improvements in a number of measurable athletic outputs.

See also 

Calisthenics
Complex training
Plyometrics
Power training
Strength training
Velocity Based Training (VBT)

References

Baechle T.R. and Earle R.W. (2000) Essentials of Strength Training and Conditioning: 2nd Edition. Champaign, IL: Human Kinetics
Baker, D., Nance, S. and Moore, M. The load that maximizes the average power output during explosive bench press throws in highly trained athletes. Journal of Strength and Conditioning Research. 15(1): 20–24. 2001.
Behm, D.G. and Sale, D.G. Velocity specificity of resistance training. Sports Med. 1993 Jun; 15(6):374-88
Bompa, T.O. 1999 Periodization Training for Sports. Champaign, IL: Human Kinetics
Elliot, B. and Wilson, G. A biomechanical analysis of the sticking region in the bench press. Medicine and Science in Sports and Exercise. 21: 450–464. 1989.
Flannagan, S.  Improve performance with ballistic training. Strength and Health. Spring 2001.
Garhammer, J.  A review of power output studies of Olympic and powerlifting: Methodology, performance, prediction and evaluation test. Journal of Strength and Conditioning Research. 7(2): 76–89. 1993.
Hammett, J.B. and Hey, W.T. Neuromuscular adaptation to short-term (4 weeks) ballistic training in trained high school athletes. Journal of Strength and Conditioning Research 17:556-560, 2003.
Kelso, T.  A Rationale for Strength Training.  Coach and Athletic Director, Oct, 2001
Komi P.V.  Neuromuscular performance: Factors influencing force and speed production. Scand J Sports Sci. 1979 1:2-15
Nawrocki, N. ( www.profootballweekly.com/content/features/features_archives/nawrocki_061901.asp ) The Athlete's Edge: 'Evolutionary training: Archuleta explodes past his competition: Pro Football Weekly's Internet Edition, June 19, 2001
Newell, K.  Going ballistic! Getting in motion with performance enhancing equipment.  Coach and Athletic Director, April, 2003
Newton, R.U., Kraemer, W.J., and Hakkinen, K. Effects of ballistic training on preseason preparation of elite volleyball players. Medicine & Science in Sports & Exercise 31:323-330, 1999.
Newton R.U. and Kraemer W.J. Developing explosive muscular power: implications for a mixed methods training strategy. NSCAJ. 1994 16 :(5):20-3
Newton R.U., Kraemer W.J., and Hakkinen K.  Effects of ballistic training on preseason preparation of elite volleyball players. Med Sci Sports Exerc. 1999 Feb; 31(2):323-30
Newton R.U., Kraemer W.J., and Hakkinen K., Humphries B.J. and Murphy A.J. Kinematics, kinetics and muscle activation during explosive upper body movements: Implications for power development. J Appl Biomech. 1996 12:31-43
Newton R.U., Murphy A.J., and Humphries B.J., Wilson G.J., Kraemer W.J., Hakkinen K. Influence of load and stretch shortening cycle on the kinematics, kinetics and muscle activation that occurs during explosive upper-body movements. Eur J Appl Physiol Occup Physiol. 1997; 75(4):333-42
Pearson, D., Faigenbaum A., Conley, M. and Kraemer, W. The National Strength and Conditioning Association's basic guidelines for the resistance training of athletes. Strength and Conditioning Journal. 22(4): 14–27. 2000.
Scheett, T. Go ballistic: this revolutionary high-velocity training system will help you bust through sticking points, become more explosive and speed up your muscle gains. Muscle & Fitness, Oct 2004
Wilson G.J., Newton R.U., Murphy A.J., and Humphries B.J. The optimal training load for the development of dynamic athletic performance. Med Sci Sports Exerc. 1993 Nov; 25(11):1279-86 
Croxdale,K and Morris,T:Plyometric Bench Press Training for More Power and Strength, Powerlifting USA, May 2002.

Physical exercise